Vedensky District (Vedanan khoşt) is an administrative and municipal district (raion), one of the fifteen in the Chechen Republic, Russia. It is located in the southeast of the republic. Its administrative center is the rural locality (a selo) of Vedeno. Population:  23,390 (2002 Census);  The population of Vedeno accounts for 8.7% of the district's total population.

Healthcare
Severe health problems in the district are interlinked with the critical socio-economic situation in the region. As of 2005, access to district health services remains a problem due to the presence of federal and Chechen law enforcement and on-going military activities in the area. In 1999, it was reported that the influx of refugees to the district led to the rise of the population in the area from 30,000 before fighting began to about 90,000 according to reports from Chechnya.

Notable people
Shamil Basayev was born in the selo of Dyshne-Vedeno.

References

Notes

Sources

Districts of Chechnya